Szabolcs Baranyi (31 January 1944 – 3 June 2016) was a professional tennis player from Hungary. He enjoyed most of his tennis success while playing doubles. During his career he finished runner-up in two doubles events, on both occasions partnering compatriot Péter Szőke.

Baranyi participated in 11 Davis Cup ties for Hungary from 1969–1975, posting a 12–8 record in singles and a 3–3 record in doubles.

Career finals

Doubles (2 runner-ups)

References

External links
 
 
 

1944 births
2016 deaths
Hungarian male tennis players
Sportspeople from Oradea